The 2018 Fed Cup was the 56th edition of the most important tournament between national teams in women's tennis. The 2018 Fed Cup was expected to feature some structural changes, including a 16-team World Group and the introduction of a Final Four event at a neutral, predetermined location. However, the ITF announced shortly before their annual meeting that they were tabling a vote on the changes for at least one year.

In one of the biggest shocks in the tournament history, Russia was demoted to the Zonal Groups for the first time in two decades, after consecutive losses to Slovakia and Latvia.

The final took place on 10–11 November and was won by the Czech Republic.

World Group

World Group play-offs

The four losing teams in the World Group first round ties and four winners of the World Group II ties will compete in the World Group play-offs for spots in the 2019 World Group.

Seeds

World Group II

Seeds

World Group II play-offs

The four losing teams in the World Group II ties and four winners of the zonal Groups I are scheduled to compete in the World Group II play-offs for spots in the 2019 World Group II.

Seeds

Americas Zone

Group I 

Location: Club Internacional de Tenis, Asunción, Paraguay (clay)

Dates: 7–10 February

Participating teams

Pool A

Pool B

Play-offs 

  was promoted to the 2018 Fed Cup World Group II play-offs.

Group II 
Venue 1: Club Deportivo La Asunción, Metepec, Mexico (hard)  Venue 2: Centro Nacional de Tenis de la FET, Guayaquil, Ecuador (clay)

Dates: 20–23 June and 18–21 July

Pool A (Metepec)

Pool B (Metepec)

Pool A (Guayaquil)
 
 
 

Pool B (Guayaquil)

Play-offs 

Asia/Oceania Zone

Group I 
Venue: R.K. Khanna Tennis Complex, New Delhi, India (hard)

Dates: 7–10 February

Participating teams

Pool A
 
 
 
 

Pool B

Play-offs 

  was promoted to the 2018 Fed Cup World Group II play-offs.

Group II 
Venue: Bahrain Polytechnic, Isa Town, Bahrain (hard)

Dates: 6–10 February

Participating teams

Pool A
  
  
 

Pool C
 
  
  
 Pacific Oceania 

Pool B
 
  
 

Pool D

Play-offs 

  and Pacific Oceania were promoted to Asia/Oceania Zone Group I in 2019.

Europe/Africa Zone

Group I 
Venue: Tallink Tennis Centre, Tallinn, Estonia (indoor hard)

Dates: 7–10 February

Participating teams

Pool A
  
  
 

Pool C
 
  
  
  

Pool B
 
  
 

Pool D

Play-offs 

Group II 
Venue: Tatoi Club, Athens, Greece (clay)

Dates: 18–21 April

Participating teams

Pool A
  
  
 

Pool B

Play-offs 

Group III 
Venue 1: Cité Nationale Sportive, Tunis, Tunisia (hard)  Venue 2: Ulcinj Bellevue, Ulcinj, Montenegro (clay)

Dates: 16–21 April

Participating teams

Pool A (Tunis)
  
  
 
 

Pool A (Ulcinj)
  
  
 
 

Pool B (Tunis)
 
  
  
 
  

Pool B (Ulcinj)

Play-offs 

References

External links 
 fedcup.com

 
2018
2018 in women's tennis